Philanthropy is the love of humanity.

It may also refer to:

Philanthropy (magazine)
Philanthropy (film), 2002 Romanian film